Sam Smeaton (born 26 October 1988) is a professional rugby league footballer who plays as a  for Doncaster in Betfred League 1. 

He previously played for Featherstone Rovers and the Sheffield Eagles in the Championship. Smeaton also played for the Batley Bulldogs in the Championship and spent time on loan from Batley at the York City Knights in League 1.

Background
Smeaton played as an amateur for the Featherstone Lions.

Career
Smeaton joined Featherstone Rovers in 2009. He missed the entire 2013 season due to injury caused by faulty gear being used during a game.

Statistics

References

External links
Sheffield Eagles profile
Profile at featherstonerovers.net

1988 births
Living people
Batley Bulldogs players
Doncaster R.L.F.C. players
English rugby league players
Featherstone Rovers players
Halifax R.L.F.C. players
Rugby league centres
Rugby league players from Yorkshire
Sheffield Eagles players
York City Knights players